Boğazköy Dam is a dam in Bursa Province, Turkey. It was built between 1999 and 2005.

See also
List of dams and reservoirs in Turkey

References
DSI

Dams in Bursa Province
Dams completed in 2005